Disley Aerodrome  is located adjacent to Disley, Saskatchewan, Canada, and just west of Lumsden.

See also 
 List of airports in Saskatchewan
 Lumsden (Colhoun) Airport
 Lumsden (Metz) Airport

References 

Registered aerodromes in Saskatchewan
Lumsden No. 189, Saskatchewan